Janez Puterle (February 21, 1950 – September 19, 2020) was a Slovenian ice hockey player. He played for the Yugoslavia men's national ice hockey team at the 1972 Winter Olympics in Sapporo and the 1976 Winter Olympics in Innsbruck.

References

1950 births
2020 deaths
Ice hockey players at the 1972 Winter Olympics
Ice hockey players at the 1976 Winter Olympics
Olympic ice hockey players of Yugoslavia
Slovenian ice hockey right wingers
Sportspeople from Ljubljana
Yugoslav ice hockey right wingers
HDD Olimpija Ljubljana players